Tourism became one of the main drivers of Guatemala's economy, an industry that reported more than $1.8 billion in 2008. Guatemala receives about two million tourists annually.

In recent years, it has led to the visit of many cruise ships that touch important seaports in Guatemala, leading to more tourists visiting the country.

In its territory, there are Mayan archaeological sites (Tikal in the Petén, Quiriguá in Izabal, Iximche in Tecpan Chimaltenango, and in the City of Guatemala). Destinations visited for their natural environment include Lake Atitlán and Semuc Champey. Historical tourism destinations include the colonial city of Antigua Guatemala, which is recognized by UNESCO Cultural Heritage.

Heritage

Tourism in Guatemala has grown gradually, is an attractive destination because of the abundant and varied natural environment and its long beaches of white sand and dark sand, coral reefs, flora and fauna, and archaeological sites, its colonial history, plus its culture expressed in their customs and traditional foods.

There is a strong interest of the international community for archaeological sites like the city of Tikal was built and occupied in a period where the Mayan culture had its most literal and artistic expression, was ruled by a dynasty of 16 kings, the Mayas of Tikal built many temples, a ball park, altars and steles in high and low relief.

Guatemala is very popular for its archaeological sites, pre-Hispanic cities as well as tourist-religious centers like Basilica of Esquipulas and City of Esquipulas and also the  beaches on the Pacific and Atlantic coasts of Guatemala. Other tourist destinations are the National Parks and others Protected Areas such as the Maya Biosphere Reserve.

 

Regarding the Intangible Cultural Heritage, Guatemala has several protected declarations by the State, among which include: the Huelga de Dolores from the University of San Carlos of Guatemala, according to Ministerial Agreement 275-2010, the Treat of December 8 of municipality of Chichicastenango, according 347-2010 Agreement and the Cofradía de San Marcos Evangelista, under Ministerial Agreement 532-2010.

See also 

 List of museums in Guatemala

References 

 
Guatemala